Serendib is a genus of Southeast Asian corinnid sac spiders first described by Christa L. Deeleman-Reinhold in 2001.  it contains only three species.

References

Araneomorphae genera
Corinnidae